Hemimyzon megalopseos is a species of ray-finned fish in the genus Hemimyzon.

Footnotes 
 

Hemimyzon
Fish described in 1985